House of Mahjong is a 2007  comedy film directed by Marco Mak and written by Shing Mo Cheng, Chiu-Wang Lam, and Ka-ming Lau. It was released in Hong Kong on 1 February 2007.

Plot
Tenants of a run-down old mall play mahjong with the owner for their rent, including Gigi (Rain Li), a sexy new tenant who learns the techniques for playing Taiwanese mahjong in order to fit in.  While she loses to the owner Fu Ho, he is impressed with her determination and rents the lot out to her anyway.

However the owner's son (Raymond Wong Ho-yin) hates the tenants and thinks they take advantage of his father.  His father, though, likes things just the way they are, especially since Gigi (Rain Li), who looks like his old flame, has opened up shop.  His son plans to run them all out and remodel the mall, so he hires a mahjong master (Matt Chow) to destroy them in a tournament to avenge his father.

Finding four mahjong experts to gamble with the tenants, Gigi, Sam, Beauty, and the other tenants soon lose their money and means of survival.  Unwilling to simply give up, the tenants of the mall rally together and hone their mahjong skills in order to keep their place in the mall.

Cast
 Rain Li - Gigi
 Dayo Wong
 Tat-Ming Cheung - Fortune Teller Cheung
 Matt Chow - Lo Mong-tak
 Chun Chau Ha - Rich Man Chiu (Fu Ho)
 Emily Kwan
 Elanne Kwong - Ling
 Amanda Lee Wai Man
 Sam Lee - Sam
 Candy Lo - Hung
 Chi Wah Wong - Beauty Lam
 Raymond Wong Ho-Yin - Chiu's son (Sun Gui)
 On-on Yu

External links
 
 House of Mahjong at Cinemasie

Hong Kong comedy films
2000s Hong Kong films
2000s Cantonese-language films